Cinnamon Flower (Spanish:Canelita en rama) is a 1943 Spanish musical comedy film directed by Eduardo García Maroto and starring Juanita Reina, José María Seoane and Pastora Imperio.

The film's sets were designed by Teddy Villalba.

Plot 
After studying with the nuns, the gypsy Rocío (Juanita Reina) returns to the farmhouse of her godfather, Count Juan (Luis Peña), she and the count's son fall in love, in what seems like an impossible love since there are rumors that they are brothers, which would cause incest.

Cast
 Juanita Reina 
 José María Seoane 
 Pastora Imperio
 Fernando Fresno 
 Antonio Riquelme 
 Luis Peña padre
 Félix Fernández 
 Ricardo Acero 
 Angelita Bernal Molinero 
 Delfín Pulido

References

Bibliography 
  Eva Woods Peiró. White Gypsies: Race and Stardom in Spanish Musical Films. U of Minnesota Press, 2012.

External links 
 

1943 musical comedy films
Spanish musical comedy films
1943 films
1940s Spanish-language films
Films directed by Eduardo García Maroto
Spanish black-and-white films
1940s Spanish films